Raymond Aimos (4 February 1889 – 22 August 1944) was a French film actor. He was shot and  killed as a FFI combatant during the liberation of Paris.

Selected filmography

 Accused, Stand Up! (1930)
 Under the Roofs of Paris (1930)
 Wooden Crosses (1932)
 Aces of the Turf (1932)
 The Regiment's Champion (1932)
 The Star of Valencia (1933)
 Bastille Day (1933) 
 Night in May (1934)
 The Last Billionaire (1934)
 Les yeux noirs (1935)
 The Decoy (1935)
 The Terrible Lovers (1936)
 Under Western Eyes (1936)
 Les mutinés de l'Elseneur (1936)
 La belle équipe (1936)
 The Volga Boatman (1936)
 Mayerling (1936)
 The Man of the Hour (1937)
 Wells in Flames (1937)
 The Lie of Nina Petrovna (1937)
 Southern Mail (1937)
 Storm Over Asia (1938)
 Ultimatum (1938)
 Port of Shadows (1938)
 Captain Benoit (1938)
 Alert in the Mediterranean (1938)
 Immediate Call (1939)
 Thérèse Martin (1939)
 Fire in the Straw (1939)
 Nine Bachelors (1939)
 Sarajevo (1940)
 The Emigrant (1940)
 Summer Light (1943)

References

Bibliography
 Michelangelo Capua. Anatole Litvak: The Life and Films. McFarland, 2015.

External links

1889 births
1944 deaths
French male stage actors
French male film actors
French male silent film actors
20th-century French male actors
People from La Fère
French military personnel killed in World War II
Resistance members killed by Nazi Germany
French Resistance members
Deaths by firearm in France